The Analogues are a Dutch tribute act to the Beatles. Founded in 2014, the Analogues' ambition has been to perform live the Beatles' music from their later studio years, using analogue and period-accurate instrumentation. The Analogues distinguished themselves by performing songs and whole albums live, which the Beatles never played live. While the band does not attempt to look like the Beatles, they have been noted for accurately recreating and reproducing their music and sound.

Touring 
From 2015 to 2016, the Analogues went on their first tour both in the Netherlands and abroad, performing the Magical Mystery Tour album.

In 2017, the band toured with a complete performance of Sgt. Pepper's Lonely Hearts Club Band, including a performance at the 17,000-capacity Amsterdam Ziggo Dome on 1 June 2017 to celebrate the album's 50-year existence. In June 2017, Dutch public-service broadcaster NTR aired a one-hour documentary on the band's painstaking process of analysing the Beatles' compositions and experimental use of studio equipment, as well as acquiring the proper analogue instruments, in preparation of live rendition of the Sgt. Pepper's album. Before an album can be performed, the multi-layered arrangements are fully written out by the band.

From 2018 to 2019, the Analogues toured the Netherlands, Belgium, Germany and the UK, playing The Beatles, also known as The White Album.

Recordings 
The Analogues signed a six-record deal with Universal Music Group for five live-played Beatles albums and one album with original material inspired by the Beatles.

Instruments 
To sound as close to the original recordings as possible, the Analogues have amassed a collection of musical instruments, such as a black-and-white Rickenbacker guitar similar to John Lennon's, a light blue Fender Stratocaster similar to George Harrison's, and a Höfner 500/1 bass. Exotic musical instruments from India are also used in their performances, including a dilruba, a swarmandal, a tanpura, a tabla and a sitar. Further special instruments include a one-metre-long harmonica for The Fool on the Hill and a clavioline for Baby, You're a Rich Man.

The band's primary analyst is bass guitarist and producer Bart van Poppel. After a thorough analysis of an album's arrangements and consulting Beatles Gear, they find the necessary equipment such as a 1965 Lowrey Heritage Deluxe organ, or one of only thirty known existing mellotrons in a particular series, used in the intro of Strawberry Fields Forever.

Critical review 
In 2014, Het Parool reviewed the premiere of the Magical Mystery Tour and described the Analogues' sound as "eerily close" to the Beatles. In 2015, De Volkskrant wrote that the band brought the Beatles' sound back to life "frighteningly well." In 2016, the Eastern Daily Press reviewed a Norwich performance as a "... musical wonder ..." providing a "... truly magical experience".

Personnel 
Current members
 Jac Bico – guitar, vocals
 Fred Gehring – drums, vocals
 Felix Maginn – guitars, vocals
 Diederik Nomden – keys, guitar, vocals
 Bart van Poppel – bass, keys, vocals and producer

Former members
 Jan van der Meij – guitar, vocals

References 

The Beatles tribute bands
Dutch pop music groups
Dutch rock music groups